The Grand Army of the Republic Monument of Judsonia, Arkansas is located in the city's Evergreen Cemetery, on Judson Avenue north of its downtown.  The monument consists of a rusticated fieldstone base, on which a cubical stone with inscriptions has been set.  This is topped by an obelisk-like tapering marble element with a square cross section, which is topped by a sphere adorned with floral detailing.  It is set in a square area  on each side, in which a number of Union Army soldiers are buried.  The monument was placed in 1894 by the local chapter of the Grand Army of the Republic, a Union Army veterans' organization.  White County, where Judsonia is located, was divided in the war, with men from the county serving on both sides in the conflict.

The memorial was listed on the National Register of Historic Places in 1996.

See also
National Register of Historic Places listings in White County, Arkansas

References

Monuments and memorials on the National Register of Historic Places in Arkansas
Neoclassical architecture in Arkansas
Buildings and structures completed in 1894
Arkansas
National Register of Historic Places in White County, Arkansas
1894 establishments in Arkansas
Judsonia, Arkansas
Arkansas in the American Civil War
1894 sculptures
Outdoor sculptures in Arkansas
Marble sculptures in the United States